Man-O-War GFC is a Gaelic Athletic Association club based in Man of War, Fingal in Ireland.

History
The club was founded in 1946 following a 'challenge' match between Hedgestown and the Man Of War. Both sides had difficulty fielding a full team, so they decided to amalgamate. Johnny Jones was a founder member of the club. In 1954 the club won its first trophy – the Nugent Cup for the Fingal Junior League. Eleven years later, the club won its next trophy – the Jubilee Cup – when it defeated Starlights in Ballyboughal. This win sparked a renewed enthusiasm and juvenile teams were formed. These juveniles were eventually to form the nucleus of the team which won many competitions in the Fingal League and achieved the club's crowning glory in 1979, the Dublin Junior Football Championship. After years of heartache and disappointment in the later stages of the Championship, Man O' War won their only Dublin Championship when defeating Fingallians by the minimum margin in Rush, having trailed for most of the match.

Successes came sporadically during the late 1980s and '90s with the team now playing football in Division 8. However, a new generation of juveniles from the mid-1990s were the basis of the team which won the Parson Cup in 2005 and earned a return to Division 7. Subsequent years have seen the team progress through Division 6 to Division 5 where the team has shown that it is well capable of playing at this level. Some compensation was earned for the loss of the 2006 Junior 'B' Championship Final in May 2007 when the Division 6 title and the Stacey Cup were won later in the year, followed by the Conlon Cup in 2008.

The Ladies section of the club began in October 1992 with a minor team composed of girls ranging from 12 to 17 years. The first hint of greater things came in 1995, when the minor team finished runners-up in the league. A few near misses on the trophy front followed, before the big breakthrough in 1999 when the ladies team went through the Division 3 North League campaign undefeated and defeated St Peregines in the playoff for the Division 3 title and promotion to Division 2. The team campaigned in Division 2 until 2008, with the major achievement of progressing to the Intermediate Championship Finals in 2003 and 2004 at Parnell Park where they were runners-up on both occasions.

A major highlight for the club took place in 2005 when they were invited to participate in the Powerscreen International 7s Tournament in Toronto. The travelling party consisted of 53 people, made up of a men's 'A' team, a men's 'B' team, a ladies team and many supporters. The ladies team were beaten in the Senior Final after a battle with Donoughmore, Co. Tyrone. The men's 'A' team were beaten in the Senior semi-final by the eventual winners and the men's 'B' team were unlucky not to reach the Junior semi-finals.

Roll of Honour
 Dublin Junior Football Championship: Winner 1979
 Dublin AFL Div. 6 Winner 2007

Toronto 2005
In 2005 the club entered  its first international 7-aside tournament, this took place in Toronto, Ontario, Canada. 52 club members spent a week in Toronto in September 2005.

References

External links
Official Dublin Website
Official GAA Website
Dublin Club GAA
Ladies Gaelic website

Gaelic games clubs in Fingal